Eckehard Steinbach from the Technische Universitat Munchen, Munich, Germany was named Fellow of the Institute of Electrical and Electronics Engineers (IEEE) in 2015 for contributions to visual and haptic communications.

References

Fellow Members of the IEEE
Living people
Year of birth missing (living people)
Place of birth missing (living people)
Academic staff of the Technical University of Munich